Aliyu Shugaba (born 4 April 1963) is a Nigerian academic, professor of biochemistry who is the vice-chancellor of University of Maiduguri in Borno State, Nigeria. prior to his appointment he was the Deputy Vice Chancellor academic services of the university.

Early life and education
Aliyu Shugaba was born in the year 1963 in Buratai village of Biu local government area, Borno State. Shugaba started his early childhood education at Buratai Primary School in 1970, after his completion in 1976 he then proceeded to Government Science Secondary School Bama and graduated in 1981. Shugaba was admitted into University of Maiduguri in 1982 and went on to obtained his B.Sc Biochemistry in 1986. Shugaba also attended Ahmadu Bello University. Zaria where he obtained his M.Sc and PhD in Biochemistry between 1995 and 2005 respectively.

Career
Shugaba is an academician and has lectured students at different levels for over twenty years.

References

Living people
People from Borno State
Vice-Chancellors of Nigerian universities
1963 births
Ahmadu Bello University alumni
University of Maiduguri alumni
Academic staff of the University of Maiduguri